was the second woman aviator in Japan and an essayist with the alias . She is said to be one of the models for the heroine in the asadora Kumono jūtan (ja), broadcast by the Japan Broadcasting Corporation.

Aviator
Komatsu Imai was born in Kyoto and trained at Fukunaga Airplane Institute in Shizuoka Prefecture.  She was licensed a second class aviator in 1927. She had an episode to maneuver acrobatics above 216 m high Kunōzan.

She was an essayist and a novelist who wrote on aviation with the alias Tatsuko Kumoi, literary meaning "Dragon Daughter of Clouds".

A politician's wife

Her husband was Kamezō Nishihara, whom she married in 1937.  He was the mastermind in politics, especially regarded as the right hand of Prime Minister Masatake Terauchi (9 October 1916 – 29 September 1918). Kamezō accomplished Nishihara Loans, a series of loans that the Japanese government arranged between January 1917 and September 1918 and persuaded warlord Duan Qirui to favor Japanese interests in Anhui Province, China. In 1938, Komatsu Nishihara moved with her husband to his hometown of Fukuchiyama in Kyoto Prefecture, where he was the head of Kumobara village for 13 years.

Komatsu Nishihara became Chairman of the Japan Ladies' Aviators Association (now Japan Women's Aviators Association) in 1955 after her husband died in 1954 at the age of 81. She died at Miyazu, Kyoto in 1984. When invited to a flight to commemorate her, heirs on board said they might have felt sorry if it was fine, thinking about Komatsu's alias.

See also 
Hyōdō Tadashi
Kiku Nishizaki
Park Kyung-won
Shigeno Kibe
 Yae Nozoki

References

Bibliography

External links
 Japan Woman Aviators Association 

1899 births
1984 deaths
Japanese aviators
Japanese writers
20th-century Japanese women writers
Japanese women aviators